Vel is the divine javelin/spear of the Hindu deity Murugan.

Vel may refer to the following:
Vel (symbol), the symbol "∨" used in logic meaning logical disjunction (i.e. "or")
Vel, Azerbaijan
Vel blood group, a human blood group implicated in transfusion reactions
Vela (constellation)
Vel (film), starring Surya Sivakumar and Asin Thottumkal
Vel River (disambiguation)
Jennifer Vel, Seychellois economist and politician
Vel Soap, a soap detergent brand
Vernal Regional Airport (IATA code)
Demon Queen "Vel" Velverosa, a character in Mage & Demon Queen

See also
Vels (disambiguation)